CNM Audios is the journalistic name of a judicial scandal caused by the revelation of audio recordings of judges, with the most notable one being César Hinostroza, talking and accepting bribes. These judges were part of the National Council of Magistracy. (Peruvian Spanish: Consejo Nacional de la Magistratura, CNM).

The first series of audios were found on 7 July 2018, through IDL-Reporteros. The recordings revealed alleged offers of sentence reductions, requests and acknowledgments of favors or negotiations for promotions of officials.

The telephone hearings were authorized immediately in the investigation of the Las Castañuelas de Rich Port case in Callao. The request of the Callao organized crime prosecutor, Rocío Sánchez Saavedra, which was made on 22 December 2017, was admitted before the Callao preparatory investigation judge, Roque Huamacondor. The telephone hearings, in charge of the Constellation Group of the Police Anti-Drug Directorate, which was carried out to mafias linked to drug trafficking, extortion and hit men in Callao, an investigation was derived that implicated judges and lawyers called "Los Cuellos Blancos del Puerto".

Due to the scandal over the recordings, on 9 July 2018, the Council of State was summoned. The National Council of the Magistracy (CNM) agreed to suspend indefinitely the evaluation processes of judges and prosecutors and its total recognition.  The Executive Council of the Judiciary announced the declaration of emergency in the judicial district of Callao for 60 calendar days  and, later, it was extended to 90 days to the entire national system of the Judicial Power. The Government announced the creation of a commission in charge of the "judicial reform". On 19 July 2018, the President of the Judiciary, Duberlí Rodríguez, resigned from office. Congress declared the CNM in emergency for nine months.  On 31 July 2018, the Comptroller General of the Republic seized and sealed CNM documentation. The Lima Bar Association decided to suspend the tuition of Guido Águila, Julio Gutiérrez, Iván Noguera, César Hinostroza and Gianfranco Paredes Sánchez. The Supreme Court declared the Executive Council of the Judiciary in emergency for 10 days.

The recordings have caused the Public Prosecutor's Office Specialized in Crimes of Corruption of officials to denounce the officials involved in the recordings before the Public Ministry.  On the part of the Public Ministry, a special team made up of the prosecutors Frank Almanza, Fany Quispe Farfán and Rocío Sánchez Saavedra.  The Public Ministry reported the filing of a constitutional complaint against the supreme member César Hinostroza and the former CNM advisers Julio Gutiérrez, Guido Águila, Iván Noguera and Orlando Velásquez. 

In the midst of the investigations, the National Council of the Magistracy refused to deliver the documentation required by the anti-corruption prosecutor Norah Córdova.   For his part, the supreme prosecutor Víctor Raúl Rodríguez Monteza demanded the delivery of the recordings and under warning be denounced "for the crime of disobedience to the authority" to IDL-Reporteros y Panorama.  Presides over nte of the Callao Court, Flor Guerrero, revealed the disappearance of documents in her institution.  The National Prosecutor, Pedro Chávarry, requested an investigation into the "persons involved in the irregular disclosure".

The recordings involve, in addition to judges, prosecutors and CNM adviser, businessmen, politicians and public officials.  On July 13, 2018, Justice Minister Salvador Heresi resigned after a broadcast of a recording with conversations with Judge César Hinostroza.  In Congress, the Ethics Commission approved initiating a preliminary investigation of Congressman Becerril and inquiries into Mulder, Heresi and Villavicencio, implicated and mentioned in the audios.  On July 19, 2018, a recording was broadcast between Judge Hinostroza and the elected prosecutor of the Nation, Pedro Chávarry.

See also 
 2017–2021 Peruvian political crisis
 Operation Car Wash
 Supreme Court of Peru
 Corruption in Peru
 César Hinostroza

References

External links
 Corte y corrupción: I Parte, IDL-Reporteros
 Corte y corrupción: II Parte, IDL-Reporteros
 Corte y corrupción: III Parte, IDL-Reporteros
 Corte y corrupción: IV Parte, IDL-Reporteros
 Corte y corrupción: V Parte, IDL-Reporteros
 Panorama revela nuevos audios de magistrados César Hinostroza y Walter Ríos, Panamericana.pe
 EXCLUSIVO: PANORAMA REVELA NUEVO AUDIO DE JUEZ CÉSAR HINOSTROZA Y MINISTRO SALVADOR HERESI, Panamericana.pe
 Nuevo audio: rector de U. Garcilaso se jacta de tener contactos en CNM, El Comercio
 Caso Guido Águila: audio confirma que Héctor Becerril se reunió con consejero, americatv.com.pe
 Caso CNM: audios comprometen a nueva consejera Ruth Monge, americatv.com.pe

2018 in Peru
2018 in politics
Political history of Peru